Heart vs. Mind is the debut extended play by American rock band I Prevail. It was released on December 17, 2014. Music videos were made for the songs "Blank Space" (Taylor Swift cover), "Love, Lust, and Liars", "The Enemy", and "Crossroads".

Reception
The album entered the Billboard 200 at No. 88, the Rock Albums chart at No. 9, and the Hard Rock Albums at No. 4 for chart dated January 24, 2015. It has sold 62,000 copies in the United States as of September 2016.

Track listing

Note
"Blank Space" is not available on the iTunes version of the EP, instead it was released as a stand-alone track and was later featured on Punk Goes Pop Vol. 6.

Personnel

I Prevail 
 Brian Burkheiser – clean vocals
 Eric Vanlerberghe – unclean vocals
 Steve Menoian – lead guitar, bass
 Jordan Berger – rhythm guitar, backing vocals
 Lee Runestad – drums

Charts

References 

Fearless Records EPs
2014 debut EPs
I Prevail albums